Damar Forbes (born 11 September 1990 in St Ann, Jamaica) is a Jamaican long jumper. He was coached by former world champion Dwight Phillips.

He competed in the long jump event at the 2012 Summer Olympics and at the 2011 World Championships in Daegu, South Korea. He was the silver medallist at the 2011 Central American and Caribbean Championships in Athletics. He placed eighth in the final of the 2013 World Championships in Athletics. He also had a win on the 2013 IAAF Diamond League circuit that year, taking the top honours at the Meeting Areva.

While studying at Louisiana State University he competed athletically for the LSU Tigers and was the 2013 NCAA Outdoor champion in the long jump with a jump of (8.35m)w. He won two Southeastern Conference titles and also had four NCAA runner-up finishes (two indoor, two outdoor).  He competed at the 2016 Summer Olympics, finishing in 12th place, and the 2018 Commonwealth Games, finishing in 8th.

References

External links

1990 births
Living people
Olympic athletes of Jamaica
Jamaican male long jumpers
Athletes (track and field) at the 2012 Summer Olympics
Athletes (track and field) at the 2016 Summer Olympics
People from Saint Ann Parish
LSU Tigers track and field athletes
Athletes (track and field) at the 2014 Commonwealth Games
Athletes (track and field) at the 2018 Commonwealth Games
Commonwealth Games competitors for Jamaica
Athletes (track and field) at the 2015 Pan American Games
Pan American Games competitors for Jamaica
World Athletics Championships athletes for Jamaica